Erukkalampiddy or Erukkalampiddi is a small coastal town on the eastern coast of Mannar Island in Mannar District, northern Province Sri Lanka. It lies along the A14 road northwest of Mannar. It contains a maternity home, a post office and a fish market. It contains several Muslim landmarks such as Erukkalampiddy Kattubawa Jumma Masjid,Erukkalampiddy Mohideen Jumma Masjid, Erukklampiddy Central College and Erukkalampiddy Muslim Mahalir Maha Vidyalayam is a first  ladies government Muslim School in Northern  Province. The principal language is Tamil.

References

External links
Official site

Populated places in Northern Province, Sri Lanka